McDonough (McDonogh)  is an Irish surname.

McDonough, McDonogh may also refer to:

Place names
McDonough, Delaware
McDonough, Georgia
McDonogh, Louisiana
McDonough, New York
McDonough County, Illinois
MacDonough Island, Island County, Washington
McDonogh Place Historic District, Baltimore, Maryland
Lake McDonough, Barkhamsted, Connecticut

Schools in the United States
McDonogh No. 35 Senior High School, New Orleans, Louisiana
McDonogh 19 Elementary School, New Orleans, Louisiana 
John McDonogh High School, New Orleans, Louisiana
McDonogh School, a college-preparatory school in Owings Mills, Maryland
Maurice J. McDonough High School, Charles County, Maryland
McDonough School of Business, Georgetown University, Washington, D.C.
Alma Grace McDonough Health and Recreation Center, Wheeling Jesuit University in Wheeling, West Virginia

Ships
USS Macdonough (DD-9), an early destroyer that served from 1900 to 1919
USS Macdonough (DD-331), a Clemson-class destroyer that served from 1920 to 1930
USS Macdonough (DD-351), a Farragut-class destroyer that served from 1934 to 1945
USS Macdonough (DDG-39), a Farragut-class guided missile frigate (destroyer leader) that served from 1959 to 1992
, an 1862 ferryboat acquired by the Union Navy for use as a gunboat during the American Civil War

Other uses
McDonough County Courthouse, in Macomb, Illinois 
McDonough Gymnasium, a multi-purpose arena in Washington, D.C.
McDonough Museum of Art, in Youngstown, Ohio
McDonough Park, a stadium in Geneva, New York
McDonogh Road, in Baltimore County, Maryland
McDonough–Fayetteville Road, part of Georgia State Route 920 in Metro Atlanta area, Georgia
McDonough syndrome, medical condition

See also